The Hubbard–Stratonovich (HS) transformation is an exact mathematical transformation invented by Russian physicist Ruslan L. Stratonovich and popularized by British physicist John Hubbard. It is used to convert a particle theory into its respective field theory by linearizing the density operator in the many-body interaction term of the Hamiltonian and introducing an auxiliary scalar field. It is defined via the integral identity

where the real constant . The basic idea of the HS transformation is to reformulate a system of particles interacting through two-body potentials into a system of independent particles interacting with a fluctuating field. The procedure is widely used in polymer physics, classical particle physics, spin glass theory, and electronic structure theory.

Calculation of resulting field theories
The resulting field theories are well-suited for the application of effective approximation techniques, like the mean field approximation. A major difficulty arising in the simulation with such field theories is their highly oscillatory nature in case of strong interactions, which leads to the well-known numerical sign problem. The problem originates from the repulsive part of the interaction potential, which implicates the introduction of the complex factor via the HS transformation.

References

Functions and mappings
Transforms